The Treasure of the Silver Lake is a 1962 western film directed by Harald Reinl and starring Lex Barker, Pierre Brice and Karin Dor. It is very loosely based on Karl May's 1891 novel of the same name. It was shot in Yugoslavia and was the first in the highly successful Winnetou film series by Rialto Film. It was made as a co-production between France, West Germany and Yugoslavia.

The film's sets were designed by the Croatian art director Dusan Jericevic. Extensive location shooting took place across Yugoslavia, particularly around the Plitvice Lakes National Park which doubled for the American West. Post-production work was done at the Wandsbek Studios in Hamburg.

Plot
Fred Engel's father is murdered by Colonel Brinkley in order to acquire a treasure map, however the Colonel only acquires half of it, the other half is held by Mrs. Butler.  Discovering the scene of the crime, Old Shatterhand and Winnetou help Fred bring his father's murderer to justice and locate the treasure of Silver Lake.

Cast 
 Lex Barker as Old Shatterhand
 Pierre Brice as Winnetou
 Götz George as Fred Engel
 Herbert Lom as Colonel Brinkley
 Karin Dor as Ellen Patterson
 Eddi Arent as Lord Castlepool
 Marianne Hoppe as Mrs. Butler
 Ralf Wolter as Sam Hawkens
 Mirko Boman as Gunstick Uncle
 Sima Janicijevic as 	Patterson
 Ilija Ivezic as 	Hilton
 Branko Spoljar as Doc Jefferson Hartley
 Milivoj Stojanovic	as 	Knox
 Jozo Kovacevic as	Grosser Wolf
 Velimir Chytil	as 	Woodward

Box office
It was the highest-grossing film of 1962 in West Germany, selling  tickets and grossing . In France, it was the 29th top-grossing film of 1963, selling 1,656,736 tickets. In the Soviet Union, the film sold  tickets. This adds up to a total of  tickets sold worldwide.

The film was a phenomenal success, predating that of Sergio Leone's films. This helped provide a cultural and financial context for the later Spaghetti Western films.

References

Bibliography 
 Bergfelder, Tim. International Adventures: German Popular Cinema and European Co-Productions in the 1960s. Berghahn Books, 2005.

External links
 
 Treasure of the Silver Lake at filmportal.de/en

1962 films
1962 Western (genre) films
1960s buddy films
1960s historical films
Columbia Pictures films
Constantin Film films
Winnetou films
Films directed by Harald Reinl
Films produced by Horst Wendlandt
Films set in the 19th century
Films set in New Mexico
Films set in Tulsa, Oklahoma
Films shot in Croatia
Films shot in Yugoslavia
Films shot at Wandsbek Studios
1960s German-language films
German historical films
German Western (genre) films
West German films
German films about revenge
German vigilante films
1960s German films
Treasure hunt films
Foreign films set in the United States